Platygyriella densa is a species of moss from the genus Platygyriella. Platygyriella densa occurs in the Americas (especially Mexico) and Africa.

References

Hypnaceae